Ivan Uladzimiravich Litvinovich (born 26 June 2001) is a Belarusian trampoline gymnast. In 2021, he won the gold medal in the men's trampoline event at the 2020 Summer Olympics in Tokyo, Japan. This was also the first medal for Belarus at the 2020 Summer Olympics.

In 2019, he won the silver medal in the men's individual event at the 2019 Trampoline World Championships held in Tokyo, Japan.

In 2018, he competed in the boys' trampoline and mixed multi-discipline team events at the 2018 Summer Youth Olympics in Buenos Aires, Argentina without winning a medal. In the individual event he qualified to compete in the final where he finished in 4th place with a score of 57.150.

References

External links 

 

Living people
2001 births
Belarusian male trampolinists
Gymnasts at the 2018 Summer Youth Olympics
Medalists at the Trampoline Gymnastics World Championships
Gymnasts at the 2020 Summer Olympics
Medalists at the 2020 Summer Olympics
Olympic medalists in gymnastics
Olympic gold medalists for Belarus
People from Vileyka District
Sportspeople from Minsk Region
21st-century Belarusian people